The Hyderabad Public School, Begumpet (HPS, Begumpet) is a privately funded public school in Hyderabad, Telangana, India. The school has grades from pre-primary to the 12th (ages 3 to 17). The school is affiliated with the Council for the Indian School Certificate Examinations (ICSE, ISC) and is managed by the Hyderabad Public School Society and the Board of Governors.

History 
It was established in 1923 as Jagirdars College by the Seventh Nizam of Hyderabad, Mir Osman Ali Khan, and served as a school exclusively for the sons of nawabs, jagirdars and other aristocrats and elites. After the Zamindari system was abolished in 1950, it was renamed as the Hyderabad Public School in 1951.

Campus 
The school has a  campus with buildings built in the Indo-Saracenic style.

Recognition
HPS, Begumpet has widely been recognized as one of the best lower educational institutions in India. Accolades include:

 Education World: The Hyderabad Public School was ranked first in Telangana & Hyderabad and sixth in India in the Co-ed Day-cum-Boarding Schools category for 2018–19.
 Future 50 Award: The Hyderabad Public School, Begumpet has been ranked as one among the Future 50 schools shaping the success in the Country.
 Education Today's India School Merit Awards: The Hyderabad Public School has been ranked third in India and first in the state and city under India's Top 20 Day-cum-Boarding Schools for exemplary contribution to the education field.
 India's Best Standalone Senior Secondary School and Best Innovative K-12 School Awards: In 2018, at the GTF Education Summit & Awards conducted by Global Triumph foundation in New Delhi, The Hyderabad Public School was honoured as India's Best Standalone Senior Secondary School and Best Innovative K-12 School.
 Great Place to Study by Global League Institute: The school was selected in the list of 'great places to study' by the Global League Institute based on the Student Satisfaction Survey. The honour was awarded by the British House of Commons.

Notable alumni

See also 

The Hyderabad Public School, Ramanthapur

References

External links

 Official website

Heritage structures in Hyderabad, India
Educational institutions established in 1923
Private schools in Hyderabad, India
Boarding schools in Telangana
1923 establishments in India